4 Lacertae is a single star in the northern constellation Lacerta, located about 2,600 light years away. This object visible to the naked eye as a white-hued star with an apparent visual magnitude of 4.55. It is moving closer to the Earth with a heliocentric radial velocity of −26 km/s. This star is a suspected member of the Lac OB1 association.

This is a supergiant star with a stellar classification of A0 Ib. The surface abundances show evidence of material that has been processed via the CNO cycle at the core. It has ten times the mass of the Sun and has expanded to about 59 times the Sun's radius. The star is around 25 million years old and is spinning with a projected rotational velocity of 28 km/s.

References

A-type supergiants
Lacerta (constellation)
J22243097+4928351
Durchmusterung objects
Lacertae, 04
212593
110609
8541